Stanford is an unincorporated community in Van Buren Township, Monroe County, in the U.S. state of Indiana.

History
Stanford was platted in 1838. The first store was started in Stanford in 1839. A post office has been in operation at Stanford since 1839.

Geography

References

Unincorporated communities in Monroe County, Indiana
Unincorporated communities in Indiana
Bloomington metropolitan area, Indiana